Christ Church is a Church of England church in Ware, Hertfordshire, England. The parish was formed out of the ancient parish in 1858 and covers the East and South sides of Ware. The building was consecrated in 1858 and is grade II listed.

References

Ware
Gothic Revival architecture in Hertfordshire
Ware
Buildings and structures in Ware, Hertfordshire